Kakuji (written: 角二 or 覚治) is a masculine Japanese given name. Notable people with the name include:

 (1914–2007), Japanese yakuza member
 (1890–1944), Imperial Japanese Navy admiral

Japanese masculine given names